German submarine U-187 was a Type IXC/40 U-boat of Nazi Germany's Kriegsmarine built for service during World War II.
Her keel was laid down on 6 August 1941 by DeSchiMAG AG Weser in Bremen as yard number 1027. She was launched on 16 March 1942 and commissioned on 23 July with Kapitänleutnant Ralph Münnich in command.

The U-boat's service began with training as part of the 4th U-boat Flotilla. She then moved to the 10th flotilla on 1 January 1943 for operations.

She was sunk by two British destroyers on 4 February 1943.

Design
German Type IXC/40 submarines were slightly larger than the original Type IXCs. U-187 had a displacement of  when at the surface and  while submerged. She had two shafts and two  propellers.

U-187 was fitted with six  torpedo tubes (four fitted at the bow and two at the stern), 22 torpedoes, one  SK C/32 naval gun, 180 rounds, and a  SK C/30 as well as a  C/30 anti-aircraft gun. The boat had a complement of forty-eight.

Service history

Patrol and loss
U-187s patrol took her from Kiel on 12 January 1943, across the North Sea and into the Atlantic Ocean through the gap between Iceland and the Faroe Islands.

She was surprised on the surface,  ahead of Convoy SC 118. Nine men died; there were 45 survivors.

Wolfpacks
U-187 took part in two wolfpacks, namely:
 Landsknecht (19 – 28 January 1943) 
 Pfeil (1 – 4 February 1943)

References

Bibliography

External links

World War II submarines of Germany
German Type IX submarines
1942 ships
U-boats commissioned in 1942
U-boats sunk in 1943
U-boats sunk by depth charges
World War II shipwrecks in the Atlantic Ocean
Ships built in Bremen (state)
U-boats sunk by British warships
Maritime incidents in February 1943